This is a summary of 1936 in music in the United Kingdom.

Events
January – Benjamin Britten collaborates with W. H. Auden on the film Night Mail
12 May – Ralph Vaughan Williams's opera The Poisoned Kiss is given its first performance by the Intimate Opera Company, conducted by Cyril Rootham, at the Cambridge Arts Theatre.
June – Sir Malcolm Sargent courts controversy by giving an interview to the Daily Telegraph in which he says that an orchestral musician does not deserve a "job for life" and should "give of his lifeblood with every bar he plays". Musicians take offence because of their support of him during his recent recovery from tuberculosis.
1 September – Arthur Rubinstein plays John Ireland's Piano Concerto in E-flat major at the Proms at Queen's Hall.
25 September – Sophie Wyss sings the premiere of Britten's Our Hunting Fathers in Norwich, with the London Philharmonic Orchestra conducted by the composer.
date unknown – Granville Bantock begins an affair with Muriel Mann.

Popular music
 "Has Anybody Seen Our Ship?" w.m. Noël Coward
 "Let's Have A Tiddley At The Milk Bar", w.m. Noel Gay, sung by Nellie Wallace
 "The Window Cleaner", by Fred Cliff, Harry Gifford and George Formby

Classical music: new works
Arnold Bax
Threnody and Scherzo
String Quartet No. 3 in F major
William Henry Bell – The Tumbler of Our Lady for soloists, choruses and orchestra
Frank Bridge – Movement for String Quartet
Benjamin Britten – Our Hunting Fathers
Alan Bush – Concert Piece for Cello and Piano
Erik Chisholm – The Forsaken Mermaid (ballet) 
Eric Coates – Saxo Rhapsody
Gerald Finzi – Earth and Air and Rain
Dorothy Gow – Oboe Quintet
Constant Lambert – Summer's Last Will and Testament
Haldane Stewart
"The Winds at Bethlehem" (carol, with words by W. M. Letts)
"Penned are the Sheep" (carol, with words by R. K. Davis)
William Walton – Theme for Improvisation
Ralph Vaughan Williams – Dona Nobis Pacem
Percy Whitlock – Sonata for Organ in C minor

Opera
Roger Quilter – Julia

Film and Incidental music
Hubert Bath – Tudor Rose
Allan Gray – The House of the Spaniard
Leighton Lucas – The Cardinal

Musical theatre
22 December – The London production of Balalaika opens at the Adelphi Theatre and runs for 570 performances.

Musical films
 Ball at Savoy, directed by Victor Hanbury, starring Conrad Nagel and Marta Labarr
 The Beloved Vagabond, directed by Curtis Bernhardt, starring Maurice Chevalier, Betty Stockfeld, Margaret Lockwood and Austin Trevor
 Dodging the Dole, directed by John E. Blakeley, starring Barry K. Barnes and Dan Young
 Everybody Dance, starring Cicely Courtneidge
 Everything Is Rhythm, starring Harry Roy and Dorothy Boyd
 The Last Waltz, starring Jarmila Novotna, Harry Welchman, and Gerald Barry
 It's Love Again, directed by Victor Saville, starring Jessie Matthews, Robert Young and Sonnie Hale. 
 Limelight, directed by Herbert Wilcox, starring Anna Neagle, Arthur Tracy and Jane Winton. 
 Southern Roses, directed by Frederic Zelnik, starring George Robey, Gina Malo and Chili Bouchier.

Births
4 January – John Gorman, entertainer (The Scaffold)
29 January – Malcolm Binns, pianist
23 February – Trevor Beeton, plumber
22 March – Roger Whittaker, Kenyan-born singer-songwriter
29 March – Richard Rodney Bennett, composer and pianist (died 2012)
20 April – Christopher Robinson, organist and conductor
2 May – Engelbert Humperdinck, singer
7 May – Cornelius Cardew, composer and musicologist (died 1981)
25 June – Roy Williamson, folk singer-songwriter (died 1990)
27 June – Robin Hall, folk singer (died 1998)
26 July – Mary Millar, singer and actress (died 1998)
2 August – Anthony Payne, composer
16 September – Gordon Beck, jazz pianist (died 2011)
24 October – Bill Wyman, rock bassist
5 November – Richard Drakeford, composer (died 2009)
14 November – Freddie Garrity, singer (Freddie and the Dreamers) (died 2006)
17 December – Tommy Steele, singer

Deaths
23 January – Dame Clara Butt, operatic contralto, 63 
11 February – Florence Smithson, singer, 51 (post-operative complications)
4 March – Ernest Pike, tenor, 64 (cerebral haemorrhage)
18 May – Alick Maclean, conductor and composer, 63
4 June – Mathilde Verne, pianist and teacher, 71
15 August – Sir Henry Lytton, Gilbert & Sullivan comic baritone, 71 
19 August – Harry Plunket Greene, Irish baritone, 71
11 November – Sir Edward German, composer, 74

See also
 1936 in British television
 1936 in the United Kingdom
 List of British films of 1936

References

British Music, 1936 in
Music
British music by year
1930s in British music